The Church of Hawaiʻi, originally called the Hawaiian Reformed Catholic Church, was the state church and national church of the Kingdom of Hawaiʻi from 1862 to 1893. It was the ecclesiastical province of the Anglican Communion in Hawaiʻi.

History
As a young prince, King Kamehameha IV had visited England and was impressed by the rich ceremony of the Church of England, compared to the dour simplicity of the American missionaries who educated him as a child. His queen consort Queen Emma had a British grandfather and was brought up in a house of a British Anglican doctor. Their 1856 wedding ceremony included Anglican prayers but had to be performed by the Congregationalist minister.

In 1859, Emma wrote to Victoria of the United Kingdom to request a clergyman from the English church. The King's foreign minister, Robert Crichton Wyllie, also made requests through diplomatic contacts. In 1860, Samuel Wilberforce suggested expanding the mission to include a bishop who could organize a new branch. William Ingraham Kip of the Episcopal Church in California also supported the idea, but the American Civil War prevented any help from them. The idea was approved by John Bird Sumner and British Foreign Secretary Lord John Russell. The first Bishop was Thomas Nettleship Staley, consecrated on December 15, 1861.

The sending of Staley caused friction with the American Board of Commissioners for Foreign Missions even before he arrived in 1862; making him a bishop bothered the Congregationalists, who opposed any kind of religious hierarchy. Rufus Anderson, of the American Board, became a fierce critic, accusing him of ritualism. The officially chartered name of "Hawaiian Reformed Catholic Church" provoked criticism as "papist". After Kamehameha IV died, an elaborate funeral service was held that was compared to a Pontifical High Mass. Staley was even attacked by American writer Mark Twain, and others whom he called "Puritans".

The Church of Hawaiʻi became the official royal church, with land donated from the royal family's holdings, not the government. Emma was baptized, followed by a young David Kalākaua who would later also become king. The Royal Mausoleum was built with a private chapel, which contrasted to the simple unadorned graveyards preferred by earlier missionaries. Observance of the holidays of Christmas and Good Friday was begun. Since Kamehameha IV had died on the feast of Saint Andrew, the first cathedral constructed in Hawaiʻi by his brother the new King Kamehameha V was called the Saint Andrew's Cathedral. The cornerstone was laid in 1867, and it became the official residence of the bishop. Two associated schools were also started: Saint Andrew's Priory School for Girls, and a boys' school named for Saint Alban, which eventually became part of     Iolani School.

After the overthrow of the monarchy in 1893 and United States annexation in 1898, the Church of Hawaiʻi was dissolved and became the Episcopal Diocese of Hawaiʻi as territorial jurisdiction was transferred to the Episcopal Church in the United States of America.

See also

Roman Catholic Diocese of Honolulu

References

External links
The Church in Hawaiʻi

Christianity in Hawaii
Hawaii
Religious organizations established in 1862
Anglican organizations established in the 19th century
1862 establishments in Hawaii
1898 disestablishments in Hawaii
Religious organizations disestablished in 1898
Christian organizations established in the 19th century